Songino Khairkhan (onion mountain) is one of nine Düüregs (districts) of the Mongolian capital of Ulaanbaatar. It is subdivided into 21 Khoroos (subdistricts).

Songino Khairkhan is located in the west, at the foot of one of the four mountains of Ulaanbaatar, the Songino Khairkhan Uul.

References

Districts of Ulaanbaatar